Uinta or Uintah  may refer to:

People
Ute Indian Tribe of the Uintah and Ouray Reservation, Utah

Places
 High Uintas Wilderness
 Uintah and Ouray Indian Reservation, Utah
 Uintah County, Utah
 Uinta County, Wyoming
 Uinta Mountains, in the state of Utah
 Uinta National Forest
 Uintah, Utah, a town located in Weber County

Other
 Uinta chipmunk, a species of chipmunk, in the family Sciuridae
 Uinta (moth), a genus of moth
 Uinta Brewing Company, a craft brewery located in Salt Lake City, Utah